A collagen- and thrombin-activated (COAT) platelet defect is a platelet function disorder that is due to a reduced ability to generate procoagulant platelets. It is associated with a clinically relevant bleeding phenotype.

During physiological platelet activation, a fraction of platelets expresses phosphatidylserine on their surface and become highly efficient in sustaining thrombin generation. These so-called COAT platelets, can be generated by dual-agonist stimulation with collagen and thrombin in a laboratory setting. COAT platelet defects should be distinguished from Scott syndrome, a rare bleeding disorder in which patients have impaired phospholipid scrambling and do not express negatively charged phospholipids on their surface even after treatment with calcium ionophores.

References

Rare diseases
Syndromes affecting blood
Coagulopathies